Billy Argyros, commonly referred to as Billy the Croc or The Croc, is a Greek Australian Gambler & Australian Poker Hall of Fame Member. 

The Croc as is a well known poker player on the Australian circuit, with his interest in the game of poker first developed when he lost all his money at a poker game that a friend had hosted. He studied poker strategy and his game improved dramatically afterwards. He began using his new-found knowledge of the game at low-stakes poker tables, but he quickly learned and moved up to the high-stakes poker games in different local casinos in his region.

In 1995, Argyros cashed in the money in the $10,000 No Limit Hold'em Main Event, finishing 15th of a field of 273 players, winning $24,220. He has also cashed one time on the World Poker Tour.

He appeared on the former television show Australian Celebrity Poker Challenge as the resident expert, during which players may call 'The Croc' to provide advice once during the game.

Argyros received his nickname 'The Croc' while playing against Johnny Moss in a satellite event for the World Series of Poker. He introduced himself as 'Crocodile Billy', copied from the movie "Crocodile" Dundee, which was popular at the time.

As of 2020, Argyros' total recorded live tournament winnings are closing in on $2,000,000.

References

Australian poker players
Greek poker players
Year of birth missing (living people)
Poker players from Melbourne
Living people